Psathyrostachys is a genus of Eurasian plants in the grass family.

 Species

References

External links
 Grassbase - The World Online Grass Flora

Pooideae
Poaceae genera